Cinzia Savi Scarponi (born 12 November 1963) is an Italian former swimmer who competed in the 1980 Summer Olympics.

References

1963 births
Living people
Swimmers from Rome
Italian female swimmers
Female butterfly swimmers
Italian female medley swimmers
Olympic swimmers of Italy
Swimmers at the 1980 Summer Olympics
Mediterranean Games gold medalists for Italy
Swimmers at the 1979 Mediterranean Games
Swimmers at the 1983 Mediterranean Games
Universiade medalists in swimming
Mediterranean Games medalists in swimming
Universiade silver medalists for Italy
Medalists at the 1983 Summer Universiade
20th-century Italian women